Saint-Colomban-des-Villards is a commune in the Savoie department in the Auvergne-Rhône-Alpes region in south-eastern France.

It is a small ski resort, part of the larger Les Sybelles ski area.

Geography

Climate

Saint-Colomban-des-Villards has a humid continental climate (Köppen climate classification Dfb) closely bordering on a oceanic climate (Cfb).

See also
Communes of the Savoie department

References

Communes of Savoie